Below is a list of the newly elected MPs as the results of the 2018 Greenlandic general election

List 

 a. Jens Danielsen, Jess Svane, Mala Høy Kuko, Nikkulaat Jeremiassen of Siumut all serve as substitute MPs in the Greenlandic Parliament for Doris J. Jensen, Erik Jensen, Simon Simonsen, and Vivian Motzfeldt in the executive cabinet.
 b. Emanuel Nûko of Partii Naleraq serves as the substitute MP in the Greenlandic Parliament for Pele Broberg in the executive cabinet.
 c. Bentiaraq Ottosen of Atassut serves as the substitute MP in the Greenlandic Parliament for Aqqalu Jerimiassen in the executive cabinet.
 d. Aleqa Hammond of Nunatta Qitornai serves as the substitute MP in the Greenlandic Parliament for Vittus Qujaukitsoq in the executive cabinet.

References 

Elections in Greenland